Miguel Altube (born 6 May 1960) is an Argentine former field hockey player who competed in the 1988 Summer Olympics.

References

External links
 

1960 births
Living people
Argentine male field hockey players
Olympic field hockey players of Argentina
Field hockey players at the 1988 Summer Olympics
Pan American Games medalists in field hockey
Pan American Games silver medalists for Argentina
Field hockey players at the 1983 Pan American Games
Field hockey players at the 1987 Pan American Games
1990 Men's Hockey World Cup players
Medalists at the 1983 Pan American Games
Medalists at the 1987 Pan American Games
20th-century Argentine people